Ryan Daniel Doherty (born February 2, 1984) is an American professional beach volleyball player.

Career

Start in baseball 
Doherty, who was born and raised in Toms River, New Jersey, grew up playing baseball, including at Toms River High School East. He was named the 2002 Gatorade Player of the Year for the state of New Jersey and was awarded a partial scholarship to play baseball at the University of Notre Dame for the Fighting Irish.  He is believed to have been the tallest player in the history of the National Collegiate Athletic Association baseball history.  While at Notre Dame, he did not play collegiate volleyball due to his baseball commitments.  In 2002, he was named an All-American.

He went undrafted after college, although was eventually signed as a free agent by the Arizona Diamondbacks in June 2005.  Despite being the first seven-foot-tall player in minor league baseball history, and playing for the Yakima Bears and South Bend Silver Hawks, the Diamondbacks released Doherty in 2007 after he did not advance past High-A Visalia Oaks.

Move to beach volleyball 
After his release from minor league baseball, Doherty moved to South Carolina and took up beach volleyball with Steve Johnson.  Shortly afterward he decided to pursue a professional career and moved to Huntington Beach, California.  He turned professional in 2010, competing in four events on the 2010 AVP Pro Beach Tour.  While in Southern California, his persistence and work ethic paid off in the form of a partnership with Casey Patterson, who became his regular partner in 2012.  They paired together to win the 2012 National Volleyball League Preakness event in Baltimore over highly ranked Phil Dalhausser and Todd Rogers.

In 2013, Doherty teamed up with Todd Rogers and began to compete not only in the domestic AVP Tour, but also internationally in the FIVB Beach Volleyball World Tour and NORCECA Beach Volleyball Circuit.  Despite a number of top-five finishes, the Rogers/Doherty combination never placed first in a competition.

Starting with the October 2013 São Paulo Grand Slam on the 2013 FIVB Beach Volleyball World Tour, Doherty had switched partners to Nick Lucena.

In the 2015 AVP season, Doherty played with Pepperdine alum John Mayer.

References

External links
 
 
 AVP player profile
 
 
 Notre Dame baseball player profile
 

Living people
1984 births
American men's beach volleyball players
South Bend Silver Hawks players
Visalia Oaks players
Place of birth missing (living people)
Yakima Bears players
Sportspeople from Toms River, New Jersey
Toms River High School East alumni